Usha Kehar Luthra (born 1932) is an Indian pathologist, and cytologist. She won a 1992 Padma Shri Award.

Life
She graduated from Lady Hardinge Medical College, University of Delhi and from Dr. Bhimrao Ambedkar University, Agra. She is a fellow of the Indian National Science Academy and the National Academy of Medical Sciences.

Works

References

External links
http://www.biomedexperts.com/Profile.bme/856386/Usha_K_Luthra
http://academic.research.microsoft.com/Author/18788100/usha-k-luthra

Living people
1932 births
Indian pathologists
Delhi University alumni
Indian women medical doctors
20th-century Indian medical doctors
Fellows of the Indian National Science Academy
Recipients of the Padma Shri in medicine
Fellows of the National Academy of Medical Sciences
Indian women medical researchers
20th-century Indian women scientists
Indian medical researchers
Women scientists from Delhi
Medical doctors from Delhi
20th-century women physicians